Nikita Vladimirovich Suleymanov (born 17 January 2001) is a Russian football player who plays for FC Chertanovo Moscow.

Club career
He made his debut in the Russian Professional Football League for FC Chertanovo-2 Moscow on 18 July 2018 in a game against FC Murom.

He made his Russian Football National League debut for FC Chertanovo Moscow on 3 November 2019 in a game against FC Fakel Voronezh.

References

External links
 Profile by Russian Professional Football League

2001 births
Living people
Russian footballers
Russia youth international footballers
Association football midfielders
FC Chertanovo Moscow players